Uinta County School District #1 is a public school district based in Evanston, Wyoming, United States.

Geography
Uinta County School District #1 serves the western portion of Uinta County, including the following communities:
Incorporated places
Town of Bear River
City of Evanston

Schools

High schools
Grades 9-12
Evanston High School
Grades 7-12
Horizon Junior/Senior High School (Alternative)

Middle schools
Grades 6-8
Davis Middle School
Evanston Middle School

Elementary schools
Grades K-5
Aspen Elementary School
Clark Elementary School
North Evanston Elementary School
Uinta Meadows Elementary School

Student demographics
The following figures are as of October 1, 2008.
Total District Enrollment: 2,973
Student enrollment by gender
Male: 1,553 (52.24%)
Female: 1,420 (47.76%)
Student enrollment by ethnicity
White (not Hispanic): 2,517 (84.66%)
Hispanic: 380 (12.78%)
Asian or Pacific Islander: 35 (1.18%)
American Indian or Alaskan Native: 24 (0.81%)
Black (not Hispanic): 17 (0.57%)

See also
List of school districts in Wyoming

References

External links
Uinta County School District #1 – official site

Education in Uinta County, Wyoming
School districts in Wyoming
Evanston, Wyoming